Sitaram Yadav is an Indian politician. He was elected to the Bihar Legislative Assembly from Khajauli in the 2015 as a member of the Rashtriya Janata Dal.

References

People from Madhubani, India
Bihar MLAs 2015–2020
1952 births
Living people
Rashtriya Janata Dal politicians